Kathmandu is the capital of and largest city in Nepal.

Kathmandu or Katmandu may also refer to:

Places
Kathmandu District, administrative division of Nepal that includes the city
Kathmandu Valley, geographic division which includes the aforementioned district and others surrounding it

Arts, entertainment, and media

Music
Katmandu (band), a 1983-1984 British band
"Katmandu" (song), a 1975 song by Bob Seger
"Katmandu", a 1970 song by Cat Stevens on the album Mona Bone Jakon

Other uses in arts, entertainment, and media
Katmandu (comics), a comic book created by Carole Curtis
Kathmandu (TV series), a 2012 Israeli television series starring Michael Moshonov, Nizan Levartovsky and Gal Gadot

Other uses
KMD Brands, a transnational chain of retail stores selling outdoor clothing and equipment that formerly was named Kathmandu

See also
Catmando, was  a cat and joint leader of the Official Monster Raving Loony Party in the United Kingdom
 Katman Du, a character in the comics Grimjack